Dundigal, officially Dundigal Gandimaisamma, is a city and a municipality in Medchal-Malkajgiri district in the Indian state of Telangana. It is the mandal headquarters of Dundigal mandal in Malkajgiri revenue division of Medchal-Malkajgiri district. Air Force Academy, Dundigul is located here.

History
It was a part of Ranga Reddy district before the re-organisation of districts in the state.

References 

Neighbourhoods in Hyderabad, India
Cities and towns in Medchal–Malkajgiri district